Huges is a surname. Notable people with the surname include:

Bart Huges (1934–2004), Dutch librarian
Jan Huges (1904–1986), Dutch rower

See also
Hughes (surname)
Huge (disambiguation)
Huger